Brazil competes at the 2014 Summer Youth Olympics, in Nanjing, China from 16 August to 28 August 2014.

Medalists
Medals awarded to participants of mixed-NOC (Combined) teams are represented in italics. These medals are not counted towards the individual NOC medal tally.

Archery

Brazil managed to qualify 2 quota places for archery, 1 quota place for the boys' events and another for the girls' events.

Individual

Team

Athletics

Brazil qualified 17 athletes to compete in the following events.

Qualification Legend: Q=Final A (medal); qB=Final B (non-medal); qC=Final C (non-medal); qD=Final D (non-medal); qE=Final E (non-medal)

Boys
Track & road events

Field events

Girls
Track & road events

Field events

Badminton

Brazil qualified one athlete based on the 2 May 2014 BWF Junior World Rankings.

Singles

Doubles

Basketball

Brazil qualified a boys' and girls' based on the 1 June 2014 FIBA 3x3 National Federation Rankings.

Skills Competition

Boys' Tournament

Roster
 Caique Cardoso Santana
 Felipe Oliveira da Penha
 Igor Pereira Cabral
 Gabriel Queiroz Ferreira

Group Stage

L16-Final

Quarter-Final

Knockout Stage

Girls' Tournament

Roster
 Tayna dos Reis
 Mayara Leoncio Marins
 Mariana Moura Queiroz Dias
 Leticia Soares Josefino

Group Stage

L16-Final

Knockout Stage

Beach Volleyball

Brazil qualified a boys' and girls' team from their performance at the 2014 CSV Youth Beach Volleyball Tour.

Canoeing

Brazil qualified one boat based on its performance at the 2013 World Junior Canoe Sprint and Slalom Championships.

Girls

Cycling

Brazil qualified a boys' and girls' team based on its ranking issued by the UCI.

Team

Mixed Relay

Diving

Brazil qualified two quotas based on its performance at the Nanjing 2014 Diving Qualifying Event.

Equestrian

Brazil qualified a rider.

Fencing

Brazil qualified two quotas based on its performance at the FIE Cadet & Junior World Championships 2014.

Boys

Girls

Mixed Team

Gymnastics

Artistic Gymnastics

Brazil qualified two athletes based on its performance at the 2014 Junior Pan American Artistic Gymnastics Championships.

Originally, Rebeca Andrade was Brazil's artistic gymnastics girl representative but she sustained an injury during training, forcing her to withdraw. Compatriot, Flávia Saraiva, took her place

Boys

Girls

Rhythmic Gymnastics

Brazil qualified one athlete based on its performance at the 2014 Junior Pan American Rhythmic Championships.

Individual

Handball

Brazil qualified a boys' team on its performance at the 2014 Handball Pan American Men's Youth Championship and a girls' team on its performance at the 2014 Pan American Women's Youth Handball Championship.

Boys' tournament

Roster

 Leonardo Abrahao Silveira
 Pedro Alves Umbelina Jr
 Gabriel Ceretta
 Marcos Colodeti
 Marcio da Silva Maildo
 Carlos de Oliveira Correa
 Gabriel dos Santos Gondim
 Leonardo Dutra
 Andre Goncalves de Lima Amorim
 Rangel Luan da Rosa
 Fernando Pereira Leite
 Henrique Petter Solenta
 Eduardo Santos da Costa Moreira
 Patrick Toniazzo Lemos

Group stage

Placement Match 5-6

Girls' tournament

Roster

 Ana Luiza Aguiar Camelo Borba
 Bruna de Paula
 Talita Alves Carneiro
 Ana Claudia Bolzan E Silva
 Juliana Borges Lima
 Lígia Costa
 Maite de Lima Dias
 Jessica de Souza Suzano Costa
 Cecilia Do Nascimento Mouzinho
 Flavia Lima Gabina
 Aline Mayumi Koeke Bednarski
 Mariane Oliveira Fernandes
 Anna Rodrigues Arruda
 Barbara Sanny Vasconcelos Ferreir

Group stage

Semifinals

Bronze medal game

Judo

Brazil qualified two athletes based on its performance at the 2013 Cadet World Judo Championships.

Individual

Team

Rowing

Brazil qualified two boats based on its performance at the 2013 World Rowing Junior Championships and the Continental Qualifier.

Qualification Legend: FA=Final A (medal); FB=Final B (non-medal); FC=Final C (non-medal); FD=Final D (non-medal); SA/B=Semifinals A/B; SC/D=Semifinals C/D; R=Repechage

Sailing

Brazil qualified two boats based on its performance at the Byte CII Central & South American Continental Qualifiers. Brazil later qualified one more boat based on its performance at the Techno 293 Central & South American Continental Qualifiers.

Swimming

Brazil qualified eight swimmers.

Boys

Girls

Mixed

Table tennis

At the moment Brazil has one athlete qualified.

Singles

Team

Qualification Legend: Q=Main Bracket (medal); qB=Consolation Bracket (non-medal)

Taekwondo

Brazil has two athletes qualified based on its performance at the Taekwondo Qualification Tournament.

Boys

Girls

Tennis

Brazil qualified three athletes based on the 9 June 2014 ITF World Junior Rankings.

Singles

Doubles

Triathlon

Brazil qualified one athlete based on its performance at the 2014 American Youth Olympic Games Qualifier.

Individual

Relay

Weightlifting

Brazil qualified 1 quota in the girls' events based on the team ranking after the 2014 Weightlifting Youth Pan American Championships.

Girls

Wrestling

Brazil qualified two athletes based on its performance at the 2014 Pan American Cadet Championships.

Boys

See also 
Brazil at the 2010 Summer Youth Olympics

References

2014 in Brazilian sport
Nations at the 2014 Summer Youth Olympics
Brazil at the Youth Olympics